Tina Renee Johns Benkiser (born February 7, 1963) is an attorney and was from 2003 to 2009 the state chairman of the Republican Party of Texas. She became chairman on the resignation of Susan Weddington.

Career
Benkiser was elected to full two-year terms in 2004, 2006, and again on June 14, 2008.  Robin Armstrong, an African American physician from Dickinson was the party vice chairman in the latter portion of Benkiser's term. He was elected to his second full term in 2008. State law requires that the chairman and vice chairman of political parties be of opposite sexes. When Steve Munisteri was elected to succeed Cathie Adams as chairman, Melinda Fredricks of Conroe succeeded Armstrong as vice chairman.

Under Benkiser's leadership, the Texas party won all twenty-nine statewide offices and maintained its majority in the Texas State Legislature. Republicans have had a net loss of seats in the Texas House under Benkiser though, after peaking in 2003, and lost two formerly Republican seats in the U.S. Congress with the resignation of Tom DeLay and the defeat of Henry Bonilla in 2006. In 2008, however, the Republican Party of Texas regained the DeLay seat with the election of Pete Olson, and also made gains in down-ballot races, achieving for the first time an absolute majority of elected offices in the state, from constable to governor, despite a disappointing year for Republicans nationwide.

Benkiser resigned as chairman on October 5, 2009, to join the successful reelection campaign of Governor Rick Perry. Under party rules, the chairman must remain neutral in primary election campaigns. Perry defeated challenges from U.S. Senator Kay Bailey Hutchison and Tea Party movement activist Debra Medina in the Republican primary held on March 2, 2010. Benkiser was succeeded by Cathie Adams of Plano, a conservative activist and the Texas Republican national committeewoman. Adams was succeeded in the post in the state convention held on June 12, 2010, by Steve Munisteri of Houston, who thirty years earlier founded the Young Conservatives of Texas.

In 2009, Benkiser was a candidate for co-chairman of the Republican National Committee with former Ohio Secretary of State Ken Blackwell, who ran for chairman. RNC members, however, chose Michael Steele, a former lieutenant governor of Maryland, as the national party chairman, who was unseated by Reince Priebus early in 2011.

Personal life
Benkiser graduated from the Mississippi University for Women in Columbus in eastern Mississippi. Her husband is Eric Benkiser; the couple resides in Signal Mountain, Tennessee. Her law practice is in the fields of corporate transactions, business formation and operations, intellectual property, and sports and entertainment law. While in Houston, the Benkisers were active members of Second Baptist Church.

References

External links 
 Tina J. Benkiser's Bio

1963 births
Living people
Texas Republicans
Texas Republican state chairmen
Texas lawyers
Politicians from Houston
Women in Texas politics
American women lawyers
American lawyers
People from Signal Mountain, Tennessee
Baptists from Texas
Mississippi University for Women alumni
Baptists from Tennessee
2020 United States presidential electors
21st-century American women